Howard Carleton Blaisdell (June 18, 1862 – August 20, 1886) was a starting pitcher for the Kansas City Cowboys of the Union Association during the  season.

Blaisdell pitched for the Fort Wayne Hoosiers of the Northwestern League (1883) and Lynn of the Massachusetts State Association (1884) before joining the Cowboys. He posted a 0–3 record with an 8.65 ERA in 26 innings of work for Kansas City, who finished 11th with a 16–63 mark. Though he was not successful as a pitcher, Blaisdell hit .313 (5-for-16) with a double and one run, a bright spot for a team which hit for a .199 average.

In 1885, Blaisdell pitched for the Haverhill club of the New England League. A year later he died of tuberculosis in Malden, Massachusetts, at the age of 24.

See also
1884 Kansas City Cowboys season

Sources

Major League Baseball pitchers
Kansas City Cowboys (UA) players
Fort Wayne Hoosiers players
Haverhill Hustlers players
Lynn Shoemakers players
Baseball players from Massachusetts
Sportspeople from Haverhill, Massachusetts
1862 births
1886 deaths
19th-century baseball players
Sportspeople from Malden, Massachusetts
People from Bradford, Massachusetts
19th-century deaths from tuberculosis
Tuberculosis deaths in Massachusetts